The BNXT League National Finals MVP Player award is given annually at the end of the finals of the national playoffs of the BNXT League, the highest professional basketball league in Belgium and the Netherlands.

The award is given to the player on the championship team with the highest index rating over all the finals games.

Key

List of winners

Netherlands

Belgium

References

External links
BNXT League - Official Site
BNXT League - Official Award Page
BNXT League at Eurobasket.com

Basketball most valuable player awards
European basketball awards
BNXT League basketball awards